Welcome to the Dollhouse is a 1995 American coming-of-age black comedy film written and directed by Todd Solondz. An independent film, it won the Grand Jury Prize at the 1996 Sundance Film Festival and launched the careers of Solondz and Heather Matarazzo. The story follows the unpopular middle schooler Dawn as she goes to extreme lengths trying to earn the respect of her vicious fellow students and her disinterested family. Dawn reappears in two of Solondz's other films, Palindromes and Wiener-Dog while her brother and father appear in the former in addition to Life During Wartime.

Plot

Eleven-year-old Dawn Wiener is a shy and unpopular seventh-grader living in a middle-class suburban community in New Jersey. Her older brother Mark is a nerdy high school student who plays clarinet in a garage band and shuns girls in order to prepare for college. Her younger sister Missy is spoiled and manipulative; she pesters Dawn and dances around the house in a tutu. Her mother Marj is a shrewish woman who dotes on Missy and sides with her in disputes with Dawn. Her father Harv is a meek man who sides with Marj over Dawn. Her only friend is a feminine sixth-grade boy named Ralphy, with whom she shares a dilapidated clubhouse in her backyard.

At school, Dawn is ridiculed and her locker is covered in graffiti. Her teacher unfairly keeps her after school after one of her bullies Brandon McCarthy tries to copy her answers on a test. Later, Dawn gets in trouble again after accidentally hitting another teacher in the eye with a spitball in self-defense when Brandon and his friends bully her during an assembly.
 
Mark's classmate Steve Rodgers, a handsome and charismatic aspiring rock musician, agrees to join the band in exchange for Mark's help in school. Dawn pursues him romantically when they spend time together, though one of Steve's former girlfriends tells her that she has no chance of being with him.

After Dawn calls Brandon a "retard" during a confrontation, he threatens her with rape. His first attempt to assault her after school fails, but shortly afterward, he phones her, ordering her to meet him again the next day. When she complies, he takes her to a junkyard, where he starts an earnest conversation with her and kisses her instead. At dinner that evening, when she refuses to tear down her clubhouse to make room for her parents' 20th anniversary party, Marj tells Mark and Missy to destroy it anyway, and gives them Dawn's share of dessert.

Dawn and Brandon spend time in her clubhouse, but she confesses to him her feelings for Steve, causing him to storm out. Ralphy, who was spying on them, tries to comfort Dawn, but she angrily rejects him when he insults Brandon, leaving her with no friends.
 
At the anniversary party, Dawn intends to proposition Steve, but gets cold feet and is rebuffed. Steve plays with Missy, who pushes Dawn into a kiddie pool. That evening, the family watches a videotape of the party, laughing when Dawn falls into the water. Later, Dawn smashes the tape and briefly brandishes her hammer over Missy as she sleeps.

A few days later, Brandon is arrested and expelled from school for suspected drug dealing. Meanwhile, Harv's car breaks down and Marj has to pick him up. She instructs Dawn to tell Missy to get a ride home with her ballet teacher, but she chooses not to after arguing with Missy, who is kidnapped as a result.

Dawn visits Brandon's home and meets his mentally challenged brother and aggressive father. She tells Brandon that she wants to be his girlfriend, but he tells her that he is running away to New York City to avoid being sent to a reformatory. After they kiss, an argument about him dealing drugs ensues, with him saying that one of his friends is the real culprit. Regardless, he asks Dawn if she will come with him, but she declines and he leaves through his bedroom window.

When Marj is informed that Missy's tutu was found in Times Square, Dawn goes to New York City to look for her. After a night of searching, she phones home and Mark tells her that Missy was found alive and unharmed by police after being abducted by a pedophilic neighbor. Dawn returns to town and her classmates ridicule her as she delivers a thank-you speech. Mark later tells her that she cannot expect school life to get any better until high school. On a bus ride to Walt Disney World for a concert tour, Dawn sits among her fellow choir members and unenthusiastically joins them in singing the school anthem.

Cast

Reception
The film was a surprise success, considering it was a relatively low budget, independently produced film. It garnered critical praise for its view of a pre-teen outcast, and won the Grand Jury Prize for best dramatic feature at the 1996 Sundance Film Festival. Critic Roger Ebert was vocal about his love for the film, giving it four stars out of four and placing it at No. 5 on his "Best of 1996" list.

The film holds a 93% approval rating on Rotten Tomatoes, based on 54 reviews, with an average rating of 7.8/10. The website's critical consensus reads, "An outstanding sophomore feature, Welcome to the Dollhouse sees writer-director Todd Solondz mining suburban teen angst for black, biting comedy." Metacritic gives the film a weighted average score of 83 out of 100, based on 20 critics, indicating "universal acclaim".

References

External links
 
 
 
 
 

1995 films
1995 comedy films
1995 independent films
1990s American films
1990s black comedy films
1990s coming-of-age comedy films
1990s English-language films
American black comedy films
American coming-of-age comedy films
American independent films
Films about dysfunctional families
Films about pedophilia
Films about puberty
Films about school bullying
Films directed by Todd Solondz
Films set in New Jersey
Films shot in New Jersey
Middle school films
Sony Pictures Classics films
Sundance Film Festival award winners